Thomas Helly (born 20 October 1990) is an Austrian footballer who plays for SC Mannsdorf. He previously played in the Austrian Bundesliga for TSU Obergänserndorf.

References

Austrian footballers
Austrian Football Bundesliga players
1990 births
Living people
Association football forwards
SC Schwanenstadt players
SC Wiener Neustadt players
Wiener Sport-Club players
SV Wienerberger players
TSV Hartberg players